Juan Ramón López Caro (born 23 March 1963) is a Spanish football manager.

He managed Real Madrid and Levante in La Liga, as well as Celta and Real Madrid Castilla in Segunda División. After a spell in charge of Spain under-21 he moved abroad, managing the national sides of Saudi Arabia and Oman, and winning promotion from China League One with two clubs.

Football career

Early career / Real Madrid
Born in Lebrija, Province of Seville, Andalucia, López Caro began working as coach before his 30th birthday, with clubs in his city of birth. His first job at the professional level arrived in the 1998–99 season, as he led UD Melilla to the first position in Segunda División B, albeit without promotion in the playoffs. He then became manager of RCD Mallorca B, and officially coached the first team in the UEFA Intertoto Cup against Romania's CSM Ceahlăul Piatra Neamț in July 2000 (4–3 aggregate loss); the reserves contested this fixture as Luis Aragonés' side had not yet commenced pre-season. 

Lopéz Caro signed with Real Madrid in the summer of 2001, being in charge of the reserve team also in the third level and achieving promotion to Segunda División in 2005. He was promoted to the main squad in December of that year following the sacking of Vanderlei Luxemburgo, and his first game was a 1–2 away loss against Olympiacos F.C. in the group stage of the UEFA Champions League.

Levante / Celta / Spain U21
After leaving the Santiago Bernabéu Stadium in June 2006, López Caro was appointed at fellow top-flight club Racing de Santander for a salary of €650,000 that would rise to €900,000 should the team avoid relegation. However, a month later and without leading the Cantabrians in a competitive match, he moved to Levante UD. The following January, days after a 3–0 defeat at city rivals Valencia CF, he was dismissed and Abel Resino appointed in his place.

López Caro returned to the second tier in October 2007, succeeding Hristo Stoichkov at 11th-placed RC Celta de Vigo. The following March he too was ousted, with the side now in eighth but nine points off the promotion places.

In May 2008, López Caro had his first international job, being placed in charge of the Spanish under-21s succeeding Iñaki Sáez. He qualified them for the 2009 UEFA European Championship in Sweden, where they were edged in the group stage by England and Germany.

Vaslui / Middle East
In June 2010, López Caro moved abroad for the first time to Liga I's FC Vaslui, on a three-year deal for a total €3.5 million salary subject to bonuses, therefore becoming the best paid coach in the competition's history. He was relieved of his duties in October, after enduring a rocky spell in Romania.

In January 2013, López Caro succeeded Frank Rijkaard as manager of the Saudi Arabia national team. After a disappointing showing in the Gulf Cup in the run-up to the 2015 AFC Asian Cup, he was dismissed in December 2014. He remained in the Middle East and was hired for the same job by Oman in January 2016, and left by mutual accord at the end of his one-year contract.

China
Remaining in Asia, López Caro was hired by Dalian Yifang F.C. of China League One in November 2016. In his only season, he won promotion to the Chinese Super League with a record points tally and a game to spare.

In April 2018, López Caro was appointed at Shenzhen F.C. again in the second division and won promotion, this time as runners-up. He was fired at the end of July 2019 with the side second from bottom in a 12-game winless run, and succeeded by Roberto Donadoni.

Managerial statistics

Honours

Club
Melilla
Segunda División B: 1998–99

Real Madrid B
Segunda División B: 2004–05

Dalian Yifang
China League One: 2017

International
Saudi Arabia
Gulf Cup of Nations runner-up: 2014

Individual
China League One Best Coach: 2017

References

External links

1963 births
Living people
People from Lebrija
Sportspeople from the Province of Seville
Spanish football managers
La Liga managers
Segunda División managers
Segunda División B managers
UD Melilla managers
RCD Mallorca B managers
RCD Mallorca managers
Real Madrid Castilla managers
Real Madrid CF managers
Racing de Santander managers
Levante UD managers
RC Celta de Vigo managers
Liga I managers
FC Vaslui managers
Spain national under-21 football team managers
Saudi Arabia national football team managers
Oman national football team managers
Spanish expatriate football managers
Expatriate football managers in Romania
Expatriate football managers in Saudi Arabia
Expatriate football managers in Oman
Expatriate football managers in China
Spanish expatriate sportspeople in Romania
Spanish expatriate sportspeople in Saudi Arabia
Spanish expatriate sportspeople in Oman
Spanish expatriate sportspeople in China
Chinese Super League managers